Boyce Keith Green (born June 24, 1960) is a former American football running back in the National Football League. He was drafted by the Cleveland Browns in the 11th round of the 1983 NFL Draft. He played college football at Carson-Newman.

Green also played for the Kansas City Chiefs and Seattle Seahawks.

References

1960 births
Living people
Sportspeople from Beaufort, South Carolina
Players of American football from South Carolina
American football running backs
Carson–Newman Eagles football players
Cleveland Browns players
Kansas City Chiefs players
Seattle Seahawks players
National Football League replacement players